Rodovia Doutor Roberto Moreira (official designation PLN-010, also known as Estrada da Rhodia) is a highway in the state of São Paulo, Brazil.

Just 19 km long, this double-lane highway has a high traffic within the urban zones of Paulínia. Is maintained by the Paulínia City Hall. It is best known as the road that connects the city of Paulínia to the subdistrict of Betel and the town of Campinas (subdistrict Barão Geraldo).

Cities
 Paulínia
 Campinas

See also
 Highway system of São Paulo
 Brazilian Highway System

Highways in São Paulo (state)